Serhetabat (formerly Gushgy) is a city in Tagtabazar District, Mary Province, Turkmenistan. Serhetabat lies in the valley of the Kushka River. The population was 5,200 in 1991. It is immediately opposite Torghundi, Afghanistan, with which it is connected by a road and a  gauge railway.

Etymology 
The name of the city is a Turkmen borrowing from Persian , consisting of two words:  meaning "border" and  meaning "inhabited place" (commonly used as a Persian suffix for naming places, such as Khorramabad, a city in Iran, and Ashgabat, the capital of Turkmenistan). The name of the city corresponds to its geographic location on the Turkmenistan-Afghanistan border. A historical part of the Iranian city Karaj shares the same name, Sarhadabad. Gushgy is a Turkmenized form of the Persian-Afghan word kushk, a term referring to mountain forts. In 1885 after taking the Panjdeh oasis Russian troops constructed a fort on the site of present-day Serhetabat and named it for the village of Kush in Afghanistan. The Turkmenistan government changed the name to Serhetabat on 29 December 1999 by Parliamentary Resolution HM-67.

Overview

In 1885, Serhetabat and the surrounding region were seized from Afghanistan by Russian forces as a result of the Panjdeh Incident (also referred to as the Battle of Kushka), in which about 600 Afghan soldiers were overwhelmed by over 2500 Russian troops.

The settlement was founded in 1890 as a Russian military outpost. A local rail line branching from Merv (now Mary) on the Central Asian Railway was inaugurated on 1 March 1901, causing some degree of international excitement.

A point south of the city is the southernmost point of Turkmenistan and used to be the southernmost point of the Russian Empire and Soviet Union. A 10-metre stone cross, installed to commemorate the tercentenary of the Romanov Dynasty in 1913, is a memorial to this fact. This cross was one of four erected in 1913, but is the only one still remaining.

Transport
The broad gauge railway crosses into Afghanistan at the station, Torghundi being the railhead station on the other side. It was built in 1960. In February 2018, the existing rail line between Serhetabat and Torghundi was restored to service. This line is planned to be extended to Herat, where it could potentially connect to a rail line under construction from Khaf, Iran. Serhetabat is the southern end of Turkmenistan highway A-388, which connects the city to Ýolöten, Murgap, and Mary. The nearest airport is at Galaýmor.

Climate
Serhetabat has a semi-arid climate (Köppen climate classification BSk), with cool winters and very hot summers. Rainfall is moderate in winter and spring, but summer is extremely dry.

References

Populated places in Mary Region
Populated places established in 1890
Afghanistan–Turkmenistan border crossings